Aslauga camerunica, the Cameroon aslauga, is a butterfly in the family Lycaenidae. It is found in Nigeria and Cameroon. The habitat consists of forests.

References

Butterflies described in 1969
Aslauga